Dev Nagar is part of the old Kanpur area in the Indian state of Uttar Pradesh. 

The locality includes leather making, rice production, baking, etc. The oldest name of DEO NAGAR is BASAU PURVA.It is  1 km from Kanpur Anwarganj Railway Station. Dev Nagar is the nearest station from Kanpur Central Bus Station. Both are equidistant from Dev Nagar at approx 1.5 km. The oldest building in Dev Nagar is BRAHMA NAND ASHRAM which was built by Pt BRAHMA NAND MISHRA in 1939. The GT Road (Grant Trunk Road) is also attached to the Chandrika Devi Road. Institute of Information Technology (IIT) Kanpur is in GT Road approx 10 km from Dev Nagar. Landmark of Dev Nagar is Dev Nagar Dharmshala, Tripathi Medical Store, Pampa Wali Gali, Sigma Studio wali Gali, Dev Nagar Pahli Gali, Bharat Stationery, Sardar Patel School, Panchaleswar Mahadev Mandir Brajesh Sweet House, Raipurwa Thana, Mathur Vaisya Janhit Bhavan, Chandrika Devi Ramleela Park(Central Park) etc. 

Dev Nagar is home to the famous temple named Chandrika Devi Mandir.

Neighbourhoods in Kanpur